was a town located in Akumi District, Yamagata Prefecture in Japan.

On November 1, 2005, Matsuyama, along with the towns of Hirata and Yawata (all from Akumi District), was merged into the expanded city of Sakata.

External links
 Sakata official website 

Dissolved municipalities of Yamagata Prefecture
Sakata, Yamagata